loudquietloud, stylized as LoudQUIETloud, is a 2006 film directed by Steven Cantor and Matthew Galkin.

Synopsis 
Alt-rock legends the Pixies broke up just as the style they helped innovate exploded in popularity in the early ‘90s. Featuring intimate looks at the band members and exciting performances, this documentary profiles the band’s 2004 reunion, one of the most triumphant and unexpected returns in the history of music.

Reception 
In a review, The Guardian wrote that loudQUiETloud "...is a warts-and-all elegy, a fascinating portrait of a gang who hooked up in their youth, achieved a measure of greatness without quite realising what they'd done and then were washed back together again; older and wiser but still with enough piss and vinegar in their systems to still feel aggrieved at the way they somehow let it slide. It goes to prove that the best rock documentaries are not fist-pumping celebrations of triumph but dark sagas of bitter rivalries and missed opportunities."

In a Rolling Stone article, Colin Greenwood applauded the documentary: “I’ll tell you if anyone wants to understand what it’s like to be in a band, is this Pixie’s documentary that Jonny brought in that we watched. That’s what it’s like, a group of people working in a close proximity for fifteen years together and going through a lot of emotion and stuff and essentially being people and coming out from the experience not to get too damaged from it and I thought that was very very very good. Really tender and accurate and I know some universal truths about it and not just about the Pixies.”

References

External links 
 
 MOVIE REVIEW | 'LOUDQUIETLOUD' at The New York Times
 loudQUIETloud at Rotten Tomatoes

2006 documentary films